The Lemelson-MIT Program awards several prizes yearly to inventors in the United States. The largest is the Lemelson–MIT Prize which was endowed in 1994 by Jerome H. Lemelson, funded by the Lemelson Foundation, and is administered through the School of Engineering at the Massachusetts Institute of Technology. The winner receives $500,000, making it the largest cash prize for invention in the U.S.

The $100,000 Lemelson-MIT Award for Global Innovation (previously named the Award for Sustainability) was last awarded in 2013. The Award for Global Innovation replaced the $100,000 Lemelson-MIT Lifetime Achievement Award, which was awarded from 1995 to 2006. The Lifetime Achievement Award recognized outstanding individuals whose pioneering spirit and inventiveness throughout their careers improved society and inspired others.

The Lemelson-MIT Program also awards invention prizes for college students, called the Lemelson-MIT Student Prize.

List of Lemelson–MIT Prize winners 

Source:

2019
 Cody Friesen (Lemelson–MIT Prize)

2018
  Luis von Ahn (Lemelson–MIT Prize) 

2017
 Feng Zhang (Lemelson–MIT Prize)

2016
 Ramesh Raskar (Lemelson–MIT Prize)

2015
 Jay Whitacre (Lemelson–MIT Prize)

2014
 Sangeeta N. Bhatia (Lemelson–MIT Prize)

2013
 Angela Belcher (Lemelson–MIT Prize)
 Rebecca Richards-Kortum and Maria Oden (Lemelson–MIT Award for Global Innovation)

2012
Stephen Quake (Lemelson–MIT Prize) (Scientist, Inventor, Entrepreneur, Professor of Biophysics and Genomics at Stanford University)
Ashok Gadgil (Lemelson–MIT Award for Global Innovation)

2011
John A. Rogers (Lemelson–MIT Prize)(Professor, Physical Chemist, and Materials Scientist at Northwestern University)
Elizabeth Hausler (Lemelson–MIT Award for Sustainability)

2010
Carolyn Bertozzi (Lemelson–MIT Prize)
BP Agrawal (Lemelson–MIT Award for Sustainability)

2009
 Chad Mirkin (Lemelson–MIT Prize), George B. Rathmann Professor of Chemistry, Professor of Medicine, Professor of Materials Science and Engineering, Professor of Biomedical Engineering, and Professor of Chemical and Biological Engineering, and Director of the International Institute for Nanotechnology and Center for Nanofabrication and Molecular Self-Assembly at Northwestern University
 Joel Selanikio (Lemelson–MIT Award for Sustainability), CEO and co-founder, Magpi, and Assistant Professor of Pediatrics, Georgetown University Hospital

2008
 Joseph DeSimone (Lemelson–MIT Prize)
 Martin Fisher (Lemelson–MIT Award for Sustainability)

2007
 Timothy M. Swager (Lemelson–MIT Prize)
 Lee Lynd (Lemelson–MIT Award for Sustainability)

2006
 James Fergason (Lemelson–MIT Prize) for his liquid crystal display innovations.
 Sidney Pestka (Lemelson–MIT Lifetime Achievement Award)

2005
 Robert Dennard (Lemelson–MIT Lifetime Achievement Award)

2004
 Nick Holonyak Jr. (Lemelson–MIT Prize) (John Bardeen Endowed Chair Emeritus in Electrical and Computer Engineering and Physics at the University of Illinois at Urbana-Champaign)
 Edith M. Flanigen (Lemelson–MIT Lifetime Achievement Award)

2003
 Leroy Hood (Lemelson–MIT Prize) for his invention of four devices that have helped unlock the human genome, including the automated DNA sequencer.
 William P. Murphy Jr. (Lemelson–MIT Lifetime Achievement Award)

2002
 Dean Kamen (Lemelson–MIT Prize) for his invention of the Segway and of an infusion pump for diabetics.
 Ruth R. Benerito (Lemelson–MIT Lifetime Achievement Award)

2001
 Raymond Kurzweil (Lemelson–MIT Prize) (Author, Computer scientist, Inventor and Futurist at Google) 
 Raymond Damadian (Lemelson–MIT Lifetime Achievement Award) for his work in magnetic resonance imaging (MRI).

2000
 Thomas Fogarty (Lemelson–MIT Prize)
 Al Gross (Lemelson–MIT Lifetime Achievement Award) for his invention of the first walkie-talkie, CB radio, the telephone pager, and the cordless telephone.

1999
 Carver Mead (Lemelson–MIT Prize)
 Stephanie Kwolek (Lemelson–MIT Lifetime Achievement Award) for her work on liquid-crystalline polymers and the development of the armored fabric Kevlar.

1998
 Robert Langer (Lemelson–MIT Prize) (David H. Koch Institute Professor at the Massachusetts Institute of Technology)
 Jacob Rabinow (Lemelson–MIT Lifetime Achievement Award) for the first disc-shaped magnetic storage media for computers, the magnetic particle clutch, the first straight-line phonograph, the first self-regulating clock, and a "reading machine" which was the first to use the "best match" principle.

1997
 Douglas Engelbart (Lemelson–MIT Prize) (computer and Internet pioneer) for his invention of the computer mouse.
 Gertrude Elion (Lemelson–MIT Lifetime Achievement Award) for the following inventions:
6-mercaptopurine (Purinethol), the first treatment for leukemia.
azathioprine (Imuran), the first immunosuppressive agent, used for organ transplants.
allopurinol (Zyloprim), for gout.
pyrimethamine (Daraprim), for malaria.
trimethoprim (Septra), for meningitis, sepsis, and bacterial infections of the urinary and respiratory tracts.
acyclovir (Zovirax), for herpes simplex virus infection.

1996
 Stanley Norman Cohen (Co-recipient, Lemelson–MIT Prize) for the development of methods to combine and transplant genes.
 Herbert Boyer (Co-recipient, Lemelson–MIT Prize) for the development of methods to combine and transplant genes.
 Wilson Greatbatch (Lemelson–MIT Lifetime Achievement Award) for the development of batteries for the early implantable cardiac pacemakers.

1995
 William Bolander (Lemelson–MIT Prize)
 William Hewlett (Co-recipient, Lemelson–MIT Lifetime Achievement Award)
 David Packard (Co-recipient, Lemelson–MIT Lifetime Achievement Award)

List of Lemelson–MIT Graduate Student Prize winners 

Source:

2021
 Paige Balcom (Use It! Lemelson-MIT Graduate Student Prize)
 Nicole Black (Cure It! Lemelson-MIT Graduate Student Prize)
 Mira Moufarrej (Cure It! Lemelson-MIT Graduate Student Prize)
 Hilary Johnson (Eat It! Lemelson-MIT Graduate Student Prize)

2020
 Daniela Blanco (Use It! Lemelson-MIT Graduate Student Prize)
 Shriya Srinivasan (Cure It! Lemelson-MIT Graduate Student Prize)
 Tzu-Chieh (Zijay) Tang (Eat It! Lemelson-MIT Graduate Student Prize)

2019
 Arnav Kapur (Use It! Lemelson-MIT Graduate Student Prize)
 Mercy Asiedu (Cure It! Lemelson-MIT Graduate Student Prize)
 Julie Bliss Mullen (Eat It! Lemelson-MIT Graduate Student Prize)
 Federico Scurti (Move It! Lemelson-MIT Graduate Student Prize)

2018
 Kayla Nguyen (Use It! Lemelson-MIT Graduate Student Prize)
 Tyler Clites (Cure It! Lemelson-MIT Graduate Student Prize)
 Maher Damak (Eat It! Lemelson-MIT Graduate Student Prize)
 Guy Satat (Drive It! Lemelson-MIT Graduate Student Prize)

2017
 Apoorva Murarka (Use It! Lemelson-MIT Graduate Student Prize)
 Lisa Tostanoski (Cure It! Lemelson-MIT Graduate Student Prize)
 Katy Olesnavage (Cure It! Lemelson-MIT Graduate Student Prize)
 Tony Tao (Drive It! Lemelson-MIT Graduate Student Prize)
 Natasha Wright (Eat It! Lemelson-MIT Graduate Student Prize)

2016
 Achuta Kadambi (Use It! Lemelson-MIT Graduate Student Prize)
 Catalin Voss (Cure It! Lemelson-MIT Graduate Student Prize)
 Dan Dorsch (Drive It! Lemelson-MIT Graduate Student Prize)
 Heather Hava (Eat It! Lemelson-MIT Graduate Student Prize)

2015
 Carl Schoellhammer (Cure It! Lemelson-MIT Graduate Student Prize)
 Josh Siegel (Drive It! Lemelson-MIT Graduate Student Prize)
 Alexander Richter (Eat It! Lemelson-MIT Graduate Student Prize)

2014
 Benjamin Peters (Use It! Lemelson-MIT Graduate Student Prize)
 David Sengeh (Cure It! Lemelson-MIT Graduate Student Prize)

2013
 Nikolai Begg (Lemelson-MIT Graduate Student Prize)

2012
 Miles Barr (Lemelson-MIT Graduate Student Prize)

2011
 Alice Chen (Lemelson-MIT Graduate Student Prize)

2010
 Erez Lieberman-Aiden (Lemelson-MIT Graduate Student Prize)

2009
 Geoffrey von Maltzahn (Lemelson-MIT Graduate Student Prize)

2008
 Timothy Lu (Lemelson-MIT Graduate Student Prize)

2007
 Nate Ball (Lemelson-MIT Graduate Student Prize)

2006
 Carl Dietrich (Lemelson-MIT Graduate Student Prize)

2005
 David Berry (Lemelson-MIT Graduate Student Prize)

2004
 Saul Griffith (Lemelson-MIT Graduate Student Prize)

2003
 James McLurkin (Lemelson-MIT Graduate Student Prize)

2002
 Andrew Heafitz (Lemelson-MIT Graduate Student Prize)

2001
 Brian Hubert (Lemelson-MIT Graduate Student Prize)

2000
 Amy Smith (Lemelson-MIT Graduate Student Prize)

1999
 Daniel DiLorenzo (Lemelson-MIT Graduate Student Prize)

1998
 Akhil Madhani (Lemelson-MIT Graduate Student Prize)

1997
 Nathan Kane (Lemelson-MIT Graduate Student Prize)

1996
 David Levy (Lemelson-MIT Graduate Student Prize)

1995
 Thomas Massie (Lemelson-MIT Graduate Student Prize)

See also
 List of engineering awards
 Lemelson Foundation
 Jerome H. Lemelson

References

External links
Lemelson–MIT Program Official Website
Lemelson–MIT Program: Winner's Circle
Lemelson–MIT Program: Lemelson–MIT Prize

 
Invention awards
Massachusetts Institute of Technology
Lifetime achievement awards